Panayiota Tsinopoulou (born 16 October 1990) is a Greek race walker. She competed in the women's 20 kilometres walk event at the 2016 Summer Olympics. She finished in 47th place with a time of 1:38:24.

References

External links
 

1990 births
Living people
Greek female racewalkers
Place of birth missing (living people)
Athletes (track and field) at the 2016 Summer Olympics
Athletes (track and field) at the 2020 Summer Olympics
Olympic athletes of Greece
Athletes from Karditsa